The South Eastern School District is a midsized, rural, public school district in southern York County, Pennsylvania. It serves the boroughs of Cross Roads, Stewartstown, Delta, and Fawn Grove, plus the townships of Hopewell Township, East Hopewell Township, Fawn Township, and Peach Bottom Township. It also includes the villages of Bryansville and Woodbine. According to data from the 2000 federal census, it serves a resident population of 17,884 people. By 2010, South Eastern School District's population increased to 19,567 people. In 2009, the district residents’ per capita income was $20,060, while the median family income was $55,846. In the Commonwealth, the median family income was $49,501 and the United States median family income was $49,445, in 2010.

Schools
Delta-Peach Bottom Elementary School 
Fawn Area Elementary School 
Stewartstown Elementary School 
South Eastern Middle School - West 
South Eastern Middle School - East 
Kennard-Dale High School

Extracurriculars
The district's students have access to a wide variety of clubs, activities and an extensive sports program.

Sports
The District funds:

Boys
Baseball - AAA
Basketball- AAA
Cross Country - AA
Football - AAA
Golf - AAA
Lacrosse - AAAA
Soccer - AA
Track and Field - AAA
Volleyball - AA
Wrestling - AAA

Girls
Basketball - AAA
Cross Country - AA
Field Hockey - AA
Golf - AAA
Lacrosse - AAAA
Soccer (Fall) - AA
Softball - AAA
Girls' Tennis - AAA
Track and Field - AAA
Volleyball - AA

Middle School Sports

Boys
Basketball
Football
Track and Field
Wrestling	

Girls
Basketball
Field Hockey
Volleyball 
Track and Field

According to PIAA directory July 2012

References 

School districts in York County, Pennsylvania